Sakalia is a genus of crabs in the family Aethridae, containing the following species:
 Sakaila africana Manning & Holthuis, 1981
 Sakaila imperialis (Sakai, 1963)
 Sakaila japonica (Sakai, 1963)
 Sakaila wanawana Martin, Godwin & Moffitt, 2009

References

Crabs
Taxa named by Raymond B. Manning
Taxa named by Lipke Holthuis